Davao City general elections has started since March 29, 2007.

Political parties

Administration & Opposition/Independent coalition

Elections in Davao del Norte
2007 in the Philippines
2007 Philippine local elections